The International Islamic University Chittagong (IIUC) is a private university in Bangladesh. It was founded in 1995 under the Private Universities Act of 1992 (Act no. 34 of 1992). Islamic University Chittagong Trust (IUCT) is the founder organization of this university.

History

Islamic University Chittagong (IUC) was founded in 1995 by Islamic University Chittagong Trust (IUCT), a non-profit organization. In 2000, IUC was upgraded to International Islamic University Chittagong (IIUC).

In 2004 IIUC was recognized as one of the 9 top-graded (A Category) Private Universities by a Government-appointed High Powered Team led by the UGC Chairman. At present, it is the largest private university with 435 (Full time: 352) teachers and 12,000 students from home and abroad. A good number of full-time teachers and students are studying abroad for pursuing higher studies with IIUC's scholarship or financial assistance or continuation of services.

The Graduation degrees of CSE, EEE & CCE are accredited by the BAETE. IIUC grants waiver, generous financial assistances and scholarships to the students at different rates depending on the results of their previous examinations and financial condition. IIUC participated in different national and international contests, winning prizes for obtaining prestigious positions. IIUC successfully organized five International Conferences on different important issues relating to education, ethics and Islamization of knowledge. It also arranged the National Computer Programming Contest in collaboration with the Ministry of Science & ICT and Bangladesh Computer Council (BCC) as part of its regular programs.

List of vice-chancellors 
 Prof. Anwarul Azim Arif (present)

Campus

The campus is in Kumira, Chittagong (facing Dhaka-Chittagong Highway).

Degrees offered

The university offers several undergraduate and postgraduate degrees:

Faculty of Science & Engineering

1. Department of Computer Science & Engineering (CSE):  
Bachelor of Science in Computer Science and Engineering (B.Sc. Engg. in CSE) [IEB Accredited]
Professional Diploma in Computer Science (DCS).
Masters of Science in Computer Science and Engineering (M.Sc. in CSE)
2. Department of Electrical and Electronic Engineering (EEE)
Bachelor of Science in Electrical and Electronic Engineering (B.Sc. Engg. in EEE) [IEB Accredited]
3. Department of Computer & Communication Engineering (CCE):  
Bachelor of Science in Computer and Communication  Engineering (B.Sc. Engg. in CCE) [IEB Accredited]
4. Department of Electronic and Telecommunication Engineering (ETE):
Bachelor of Science in Electronic and Telecommunication Engineering (B.Sc. in ETE)
5. Department of Civil Engineering (CE): 
Bachelor of Science in Civil Engineering (B.Sc. in CE)
6. Department of Pharmacy: 
Bachelor of Pharmacy (B.Pharma.)

Faculty of Business Studies 

Master of Business Administration (MBA) [Regular]
Master of Business Administration (MBA) [Executive]
Master of Bank Management (MBM)
Bachelor of Business Administration (BBA)

Faculty of Law

 Bachelor of Laws (LLB Hons.)
Master of Laws (LLM)

Faculty of Arts & Humanities

 English Language and Literature (ELL): Master of Arts in English Language and Literature, Masters of Arts in English Language Teaching (ELT), 
Bachelor of Arts (Hons.) in English Language and Literature
 Arabic Language and Literature (ALL), Bachelor of Arts (Hons.) in Arabic Language and Literature

Faculty of Social Sciences

Department of Economics & Banking 
BSS (Hons) in Economics & Banking (EB)
MSS in Economics & Banking (EB)

Department of Library & Information Science 
Post Graduate Diploma in Library & Information Sciences (PGDLIS)

Faculty of Shari'ah & Islamic Studies
Qur'anic Sciences and Islamic Studies (QSIS):
 Master of Arts in Qura'nic Sciences and Islamic Studies (MQSIS)
 Bachelor of Arts (Hons.) in Qur'anic Sciences and Islamic Studies (QSIS)
 Bachelor of Arts (Hons.) in Da'wah and Islamic Studies (DIS)
 Master of Arts in Da'wah and Islamic Studies (MDIS)
 Bachelor of Arts (Hons.) in Da'wah and Islamic Studies

Library and Information Division

There are seven libraries in IIUC, listed here with area information and number of books:

Accreditation
IIUC is graded by a team constituted by the prime minister in 2004 headed by the chairman of UGC for evaluating the standard and quality of existing 57 private universities. IIUC is the first private university which has been accredited by the Board of Accreditation for Engineering and Technical Education (BAETE) for fulfilling all requirements in its CSE, EEE and CCE programs. It is the first private university in Bangladesh accredited by BAETE.

Hostel facilities

Hostel accommodation is available. The hostels are as follows (separate hostel for foreign students):

Permanent Campus (Kumira):

1. Hazrat Abu Bakr (R.A) Hall

2. Hazrat Umar (R.A) Hall

3. Hazrat Uthman (R.A) Hall

4. Hazrat Ali (R.A) Hall  (Under Construction)

Chittagong City:

1.Prasanti Vaban (Kornel hat)

 Hostel facilities are not available right now.

Scholarships
IIUC offers scholarships in each semester.
Full-time teachers are studying abroad for higher degrees with an IIUC scholarship. Current faculty or students are provided with a scholarship for higher study in home or abroad.

Foreign collaboration

IIUC has signed for formal academic collaboration Memoranda of Understanding (MoU). Under these agreements, students of IIUC are able to transfer their credits to several universities and institutions.

Events
IIUC has organized events such as the National Computer Programming Contest, Inter-university Programming Contest, Intra-university Programming Contest, IT Festival, Job Fair, Dynamic Leadership Training Camp, Poem Recitation Workshop, Annual Cultural festival, Programming Workshop, Open Source Workshop, and hardware and software fairs.

In August 2007 it organized Open Source Campaign-5 which was a step towards open source awareness in Chittagong and in Bangladesh. It ran from August 31 to September 1, 2007. It mainly focused on open source and its features, flexibility and its opportunities in Bangladesh and the whole world. Recently IEEE Day 2021 was celebrated at IIUC.

Gallery

References

External links

IIUC Main academic website
IIUC Alumni website (subscription open)
Private Universities List

Educational institutions established in 1995
Islamic universities and colleges in Bangladesh
Private universities in Bangladesh
Universities and colleges in Chittagong
1995 establishments in Bangladesh